35 mm may refer to:

 135 film, a type of still photography format commonly referred to as 35 mm film
 35 mm movie film, a type of motion picture film stock
 35MM, a "musical exhibition" by Ryan Scott Oliver that features music played to photos